The representation theory of groups is a part of mathematics which examines how groups act on given structures.

Here the focus is in particular on operations of groups on vector spaces. Nevertheless, groups acting on other groups or on sets are also considered. For more details, please refer to the section on permutation representations.

Other than a few marked exceptions, only finite groups will be considered in this article. We will also restrict ourselves to vector spaces over fields of characteristic zero. Because the theory of algebraically closed fields of characteristic zero is complete, a theory valid for a special algebraically closed field of characteristic zero is also valid for every other algebraically closed field of characteristic zero. Thus, without loss of generality, we can study vector spaces over 

Representation theory is used in many parts of mathematics, as well as in quantum chemistry and physics. Among other things it is used in algebra to examine the structure of groups. There are also applications in harmonic analysis and number theory. For example, representation theory is used in the modern approach to gain new results about automorphic forms.

Definition

Linear representations
Let  be a –vector space and  a finite group.

The representation of a group in a module instead of a vector space is also called a linear representation.

We write  for the representation  of  Sometimes we use the notation  if it is clear to which representation the space  belongs.

In this article we will restrict ourselves to the study of finite-dimensional representation spaces, except for the last chapter. The representation space of this subrepresentation is then finite-dimensional.

The degree of a representation is the dimension  of its representation space  The notation  is sometimes used to denote the degree of a representation

Examples

For example, let  be a nontrivial linear representation. In other words,  has to be one of the following three maps:

Let  and let  be the group homomorphism defined by: 

Permutation representation

A group acting on a finite set is sometimes considered sufficient for the definition of the permutation representation. However, since we want to construct examples for linear representations - where groups act on vector spaces instead of on arbitrary finite sets - we have to proceed in a different way.

Example.

Left- and right-regular representation

The right-regular representation is defined on the same vector space with a similar homomorphism:  In the same way as before  is a basis of  Just as in the case of the left-regular representation, the degree of the right-regular representation is equal to the order of 

Both representations are isomorphic via  For this reason they are not always set apart, and often referred to as "the" regular representation.

A closer look provides the following result: A given linear representation  is isomorphic to the left-regular representation if and only if there exists a  such that  is a basis of 

Example.

Representations, modules and the convolution algebra
Every element  can then be uniquely expressed as

The multiplication in  extends that in  distributively.

By linear extension  is endowed with the structure of a left-–module. Vice versa we obtain a linear representation of  starting from a –module . Additionally, homomorphisms of representations are in bijective correspondence with group algebra homomorphisms. Therefore, these terms may be used interchangeably. This is an example of an isomorphism of categories.

Suppose  In this case the left –module given by  itself corresponds to the left-regular representation. In the same way  as a right –module corresponds to the right-regular representation.

In the following we will define the convolution algebra: Let  be a group, the set  is a –vector space with the operations addition and scalar multiplication then this vector space is isomorphic to  The convolution of two elements  defined by

makes  an algebra. The algebra  is called the convolution algebra.

The convolution algebra is free and has a basis indexed by the group elements:  where

Using the properties of the convolution we obtain: 

Obviously the prior map is bijective. A closer inspection of the convolution of two basis elements as shown in the equation above reveals that the multiplication in  corresponds to that in  Thus, the convolution algebra and the group algebra are isomorphic as algebras.

The involution

turns  into a –algebra. We have 

A representation  of a group  extends to a –algebra homomorphism  by  Since multiplicity is a characteristic property of algebra homomorphisms,  satisfies  If  is unitary, we also obtain  For the definition of a unitary representation, please refer to the chapter on properties. In that chapter we will see that (without loss of generality) every linear representation can be assumed to be unitary.

Using the convolution algebra we can implement a Fourier transformation on a group  In the area of harmonic analysis it is shown that the following definition is consistent with the definition of the Fourier transformation on 

This transformation satisfies

Maps between representations

A map between two representations  of the same group  is a linear map  with the property that  holds for all  In other words, the following diagram commutes for all :

Such a map is also called –linear, or an equivariant map. The composition of equivariant maps is again an equivariant map. There is a category of representations with equivariant maps as its morphisms. They are again –modules. Thus, they provide representations of  due to the correlation described in the previous section.

Irreducible representations and Schur's lemma

The restriction  is an isomorphism of  onto itself.
Any representation V has at least two subrepresentations, namely the one consisting only of 0, and the one consisting of V itself. The representation is called an irreducible representation, if these two are the only subrepresentations. Some authors also call these representations simple, given that they are precisely the simple modules over the group algebra .

Schur's lemma puts a strong constraint on maps between irreducible representations.

Otherwise, if the two representations are not isomorphic, F must be 0.

Properties
Two representations  are called equivalent or isomorphic, if there exists a –linear vector space isomorphism between the representation spaces. In other words, they are isomorphic if there exists a bijective linear map  such that  for all  In particular, equivalent representations have the same degree.

A representation  is called faithful when  is injective.

We can restrict the range as well as the domain:

If there is no danger of confusion, we might use only  or in short 

The notation  or in short  is also used to denote the restriction of the representation  of  onto 

Let  be a function on  We write  or shortly  for the restriction to the subgroup 

It can be proven that the number of irreducible representations of a group  (or correspondingly the number of simple –modules) equals the number of conjugacy classes of 

A representation is called semisimple or completely reducible if it can be written as a direct sum of irreducible representations. This is analogous to the corresponding definition for a semisimple algebra.

For the definition of the direct sum of representations please refer to the section on direct sums of representations.

A representation is called isotypic if it is a direct sum of pairwise isomorphic irreducible representations.

Every vector space over  can be provided with an inner product. A representation  of a group  in a vector space endowed with an inner product is called unitary if  is unitary for every  This means that in particular every  is diagonalizable. For more details see the article on unitary representations.

A representation is unitary with respect to a given inner product if and only if the inner product is invariant with regard to the induced operation of  i.e. if and only if  holds for all 

A given inner product  can be replaced by an invariant inner product by exchanging  with

Thus, without loss of generality we can assume that every further considered representation is unitary.

Example.

This representation is faithful. The subspace  is a –invariant subspace. Thus, there exists a nontrivial subrepresentation  with  Therefore, the representation is not irreducible. The mentioned subrepresentation is of degree one and irreducible. 
Therefore, we obtain the subrepresentation  with

This subrepresentation is also irreducible. That means, the original representation is completely reducible: 

Both subrepresentations are isotypic and are the two only non-zero isotypes of 

Let  be any vector space isomorphism. Then  which is defined by the equation  for all  is a representation isomorphic to 

By restricting the domain of the representation to a subgroup, e.g.  we obtain the representation  This representation is defined by the image  whose explicit form is shown above.

Constructions

The dual representation

Let  be a given representation.

For an example, see the main page on this topic: Dual representation.

Direct sum of representations

The direct sum of these representations is a linear representation and is defined as

Example.

Then

As it is sufficient to consider the image of the generating element, we find that

Tensor product of representations

Let  be linear representations.

Example. We reexamine the example provided for the direct sum:

The outer tensor product

Using the standard basis of  we have the following for the generating element:

Remark. Note that the direct sum and the tensor products have different degrees and hence are different representations.

Let  be two linear representations of the same group.

These two cases have to be strictly distinguished. The first case is a representation of the group product into the tensor product of the corresponding representation spaces. The second case is a representation of the group  into the tensor product of two representation spaces of this one group. But this last case can be viewed as a special case of the first one by focusing on the diagonal subgroup  This definition can be iterated a finite number of times.

Let  and  be representations of the group  Then  is a representation by virtue of the following identity: .
 for all 

Theorem.

Symmetric and alternating square
Let  be a linear representation of  Let  be a basis of  Define  by extending  linearly. It then holds that  and therefore  splits up into  in which 

These subspaces are –invariant and by this define subrepresentations which are called the symmetric square and the alternating square, respectively. These subrepresentations are also defined in  although in this case they are denoted wedge product  and symmetric product  In case that  the vector space  is in general not equal to the direct sum of these two products.

Decompositions
In order to understand representations more easily, a decomposition of the representation space into the direct sum of simpler subrepresentations would be desirable.
This can be achieved for finite groups as we will see in the following results. More detailed explanations and proofs may be found in  [1] and  [2].

Theorem. (Maschke) Let  be a linear representation where  is a vector space over a field of characteristic zero.
A subrepresentation and its complement determine a representation uniquely.

The following theorem will be presented in a more general way, as it provides a very beautiful result about representations of compact – and therefore also of finite – groups:

Theorem. Every linear representation of a compact group over a field of characteristic zero is a direct sum of irreducible representations.

Or in the language of -modules: If  the group algebra  is semisimple, i.e. it is the direct sum of simple algebras.

Note that this decomposition is not unique. However, the number of how many times a subrepresentation isomorphic to a given irreducible representation is occurring in this decomposition is independent of the choice of decomposition.

The canonical decomposition

To achieve a unique decomposition, one has to combine all the irreducible subrepresentations that are isomorphic to each other. That means, the representation space is decomposed into a direct sum of its isotypes. This decomposition is uniquely determined. It is called the canonical decomposition.

Let  be the set of all irreducible representations of a group  up to isomorphism.

In the following, we show how to determine the isotype to the trivial representation:

Definition (Projection formula). For every representation  of a group  we define 

In general,  is not -linear. We define 
 
Then  is a -linear map, because 

Proposition.

This proposition enables us to determine the isotype to the trivial subrepresentation of a given representation explicitly.

Since the trace of the projection is the sum of all eigenvalues, we obtain the following result 

in which  denotes the isotype of the trivial representation.

That means the following equation holds

Let  be an orthonormal basis of  Then we have:

Therefore, the following is valid for a nontrivial irreducible representation : 

Example. Let  be the permutation groups in three elements. Let  be a linear representation of  defined on the generating elements as follows:

With the help of the irreducibility criterion taken from the next chapter, we could realize that  is irreducible but  is not. This is because (in terms of the inner product from ”Inner product and characters” below) we have 

Restricted to this subspace we obtain the trivial representation.

Again, we can use the irreducibility criterion of the next chapter to prove that  is irreducible.

 
is the corresponding decomposition of the representation space.

The theorems above are in general not valid for infinite groups. This will be demonstrated by the following example: let

We consider the representation  for all  The subspace  is a -invariant subspace. However, there exists no -invariant complement to this subspace. The assumption that such a complement exists would entail that every matrix is diagonalizable over  This is known to be wrong and thus yields a contradiction.

The moral of the story is that if we consider infinite groups, it is possible that a representation - even one that is not irreducible - can not be decomposed into a direct sum of irreducible subrepresentations.

Character theory

Definitions

The character of a representation  is defined as the map

 in which  denotes the trace of the linear map 

Even though the character is a map between two groups, it is not in general a group homomorphism, as the following example shows.

Let  be the representation defined by:

The character  is given by 

Characters of permutation representations are particularly easy to compute.

For example, the character of the regular representation  is given by

where  denotes the neutral element of

Properties
A crucial property of characters is the formula

This formula follows from the fact that the trace of a product AB of two square matrices is the same as the trace of BA. Functions  satisfying such a formula are called class functions. Put differently, class functions and in particular characters are constant on each conjugacy class 
If the degree of the representation is n, then the sum is n long. If s has order m, these eigenvalues are all m-th roots of unity. This fact can be used to show that  and it also implies 

In general,  is a normal subgroup in 
The following table shows how the characters  of two given representations   give rise to characters of related representations.

Inner product and characters

In order to show some particularly interesting results about characters, it is rewarding to consider a more general type of functions on groups:

Definition (Class functions).

Note that every character is a class function, as the trace of a matrix is preserved under conjugation.

Its dimension is equal to the number of conjugacy classes of 

Proofs of the following results of this chapter may be found in [1], [2] and [3].

An inner product can be defined on the set of all class functions on a finite group:

Orthonormal property.
 
 Every class function  may be expressed as a unique linear combination of the irreducible characters .
One might verify that the irreducible characters generate  by showing that there exists no nonzero class function which is orthogonal to all the irreducible characters. For  a representation and  a class function, denote  Then for  irreducible, we have  from Schur's lemma. Suppose  is a class function which is orthogonal to all the characters. Then by the above we have  whenever  is irreducible. But then it follows that  for all , by decomposability. Take  to be the regular representation. Applying  to some particular basis element , we get .  Since this is true for all , we have 

It follows from the orthonormal property that the number of non-isomorphic irreducible representations of a group  is equal to the number of conjugacy classes of 

The inner product defined above can be extended on the set of all -valued functions  on a finite group:

A symmetric bilinear form can also be defined on 

These two forms match on the set of characters. If there is no danger of confusion the index of both forms  and  will be omitted.

Let  be two –modules.

This form is bilinear with respect to the direct sum.

In the following, these bilinear forms will allow us to obtain some important results with respect to the decomposition and irreducibility of representations.

Then

It is possible to derive the following theorem from the results above, along with Schur's lemma and the complete reducibility of representations.

Theorem. We also get:

and thus

Corollary. Two representations with the same character are isomorphic. This means that every representation is determined by its character.

With this we obtain a very useful result to analyse representations:

 Irreducibility criterion. Let  be the character of the representation  then we have  The case  holds if and only if  is irreducible.

Corollary.

In terms of the group algebra, this means that  as algebras.

As a numerical result we get: 

Recall that  denotes the neutral element of the group.

This formula is a "necessary and sufficient" condition for the problem of classifying the irreducible representations of a group up to isomorphism. It provides us with the means to check whether we found all the isomorphism classes of irreducible representations of a group.

Similarly, by using the character of the regular representation evaluated at  we get the equation:

Using the description of representations via the convolution algebra we achieve an equivalent formulation of these equations:

The Fourier inversion formula:

In addition, the Plancherel formula holds:

In both formulas  is a linear representation of a group  and 

The corollary above has an additional consequence:

Lemma. Let  be a group. Then the following is equivalent:
  is abelian.
 All irreducible representations of  have degree

The induced representation

As was shown in the section on properties of linear representations, we can - by restriction - obtain a representation of a subgroup starting from a representation of a group. Naturally we are interested in the reverse process: Is it possible to obtain the representation of a group starting from a representation of a subgroup? We will see that the induced representation defined below provides us with the necessary concept. Admittedly, this construction is not inverse but rather adjoint to the restriction.

Definitions
Let  be a linear representation of  Let  be a subgroup and  the restriction. Let  be a subrepresentation of  We write  to denote this representation. Let  The vector space  depends only on the left coset  of  Let  be a representative system of  then

is a subrepresentation of 

where  for every 

The representation space itself is frequently used instead of the representation map, i.e.  or  if the representation  is induced by

Alternative description of the induced representation
By using the group algebra we obtain an alternative description of the induced representation:

Let  be a group,  a –module and  a –submodule of  corresponding to the subgroup  of  We say that  is induced by  if  in which  acts on the first factor:  for all

Properties
The results introduced in this section will be presented without proof. These may be found in  [1] and  [2].

Uniqueness and existence of the induced representation.

Transitivity of induction. Then we have

Lemma.

Induction on class functions. In the same way as it was done with representations, we can - by induction - obtain a class function on the group from a class function on a subgroup.

Proposition. The function  is a class function on  If  is the character of a representation  of  then  is the character of the induced representation  of 

Lemma.

Theorem. Let  be the representation of  induced by the representation  of the subgroup  Let  and  be the corresponding characters. Let  be a representative system of  The induced character is given by

Frobenius reciprocity

Frobenius reciprocity. If  and  we have 

This statement is also valid for the inner product.

Mackey's irreducibility criterion
George Mackey established a criterion to verify the irreducibility of induced representations. For this we will first need some definitions and some specifications with respect to the notation.

Let  be a group and let  be a subgroup.

Mackey's irreducibility criterion. The induced representation  is irreducible if and only if the following conditions are satisfied:
  is irreducible

Thus we obtain the following:

Corollary. Let  be a normal subgroup of  Then  is irreducible if and only if  is irreducible and not isomorphic to the conjugates  for

Applications to special groups
In this section we present some applications of the so far presented theory to normal subgroups and to a special group, the semidirect product of a subgroup with an abelian normal subgroup.

Proposition. Let  be a normal subgroup of the group  and let  be an irreducible representation of  Then one of the following statements has to be valid:
Proof. If this decomposition is trivial, we are in the second case. Otherwise, the larger -action permutes these isotypic modules; because  is irreducible as a -module, the permutation action is transitive (in fact primitive).

We obtain also the following

Corollary.

Classification of representations of a semidirect product
In the following, let  be a semidirect product such that the normal semidirect factor, is abelian. This is the so-called method of “little groups” of Wigner and Mackey.

Proposition.
  is irreducible.

Amongst others, the criterion of Mackey and a conclusion based on the Frobenius reciprocity are needed for the proof of the proposition. Further details may be found in [1].

In other words, we classified all irreducible representations of

Representation ring

With the multiplication provided by the tensor product,  becomes a ring.

Because a representation is determined by its character,  is injective.

As the irreducible characters form an orthonormal basis of  induces an isomorphism

This isomorphism is defined on a basis out of elementary tensors  by  respectively  and extended bilinearly.

It then holds that  and  Thus, we have  and the virtual characters correspond to the virtual representations in an optimal manner.

Since  holds,  is the set of all virtual characters. As the product of two characters provides another character,  is a subring of the ring  of all class functions on  Because the  form a basis of  we obtain, just as in the case of  an isomorphism 

If  is a commutative ring, the homomorphisms  and  may be extended to –linear maps:

Let  and  be two groups with respective representations  and  Then,  is the representation of the direct product  as was shown in a previous section.

Induction theorems

Induction theorems relate the representation ring of a given finite group G to representation rings of a family X consisting of some subsets H of G. More precisely, for such a collection of subgroups, the induction functor yields a map 
; induction theorems give criteria for the surjectivity of this map or closely related ones.
Artin's induction theorem is the most elementary theorem in this group of results. It asserts that the following are equivalent:

  is the union of the conjugates of the subgroups belonging to  i.e. 

Since  is finitely generated as a group, the first point can be rephrased as follows:
For each character  of  there exist virtual characters  and an integer  such that 
 gives two proofs of this theorem.

Under the above circumstances, it is not in general true that  is surjective. Brauer's induction theorem asserts that  is surjective, provided that X is the family of all elementary subgroups.
The elementary subgroups H arising in Brauer's theorem have a richer representation theory than cyclic groups, they at least have the property that any irreducible representation for such H is induced by a one-dimensional representation of a (necessarily also elementary) subgroup . (This latter property can be shown to hold for any supersolvable group, which includes nilpotent groups and, in particular, elementary groups.) This ability to induce representations from degree 1 representations has some further consequences in the representation theory of finite groups.

Real representations
For proofs and more information about representations over general subfields of  please refer to  [2].

If a group  acts on a real vector space  the corresponding representation on the complex vector space  is called real ( is called the complexification of ).

Let  be a real representation. The linear map  is -valued for all  Thus, we can conclude that the character of a real representation is always real-valued. But not every representation with a real-valued character is real. To make this clear, let  be a finite, non-abelian subgroup of the group

Suppose  is a real representation, then  would consist only of real-valued matrices. Thus,  However the circle group is abelian but  was chosen to be a non-abelian group. Now we only need to prove the existence of a non-abelian, finite subgroup of  To find such a group, observe that  can be identified with the units of the quaternions.

Lemma.

 
Therefore, by classifying all the irreducible representations that are real over  we still haven't classified all the irreducible real representations. But we achieve the following:

Let  be a real vector space.

Definition. A quaternionic representation is a (complex) representation  which possesses a –invariant anti-linear homomorphism  satisfying  Thus, a skew-symmetric, nondegenerate –invariant bilinear form defines a quaternionic structure on 

Theorem. An irreducible representation  is one and only one of the following:
 (i) complex:  is not real-valued and there exists no –invariant nondegenerate bilinear form on 
 (ii) real:  a real representation;  has a –invariant nondegenerate symmetric bilinear form.
 (iii) quaternionic:  is real, but  is not real;  has a –invariant skew-symmetric nondegenerate bilinear form.

Representations of particular groups

Symmetric groups

Representation of the symmetric groups  have been intensely studied. For example,  has three irreducible representations, corresponding to the partitions

3; 2+1; 1+1+1

of 3. For such a partition, a Young tableau is a graphical device depicting a partition. The irreducible representation corresponding to such a partition (or Young tableau) is called a Specht module.

The direct sum of all these representation rings

inherits from these constructions the structure of a Hopf algebra which, it turns out, is closely related to symmetric functions.

Finite groups of Lie type

Instead, new building blocks, known as cuspidal representations, are needed.

A geometric description of irreducible representations of such groups, including the above-mentioned cuspidal representations, is obtained by Deligne-Lusztig theory, which constructs such representation in the l-adic cohomology of Deligne-Lusztig varieties.

The philosophy of cusp forms highlights the kinship of representation theoretic aspects of these types of groups with general linear groups of local fields such as Qp and of the ring of adeles, see .

Outlook—Representations of compact groups
The theory of representations of compact groups may be, to some degree, extended to locally compact groups. The representation theory unfolds in this context great importance for harmonic analysis and the study of automorphic forms. For proofs, further information and for a more detailed insight which is beyond the scope of this chapter please consult  [4] and  [5].

Definition and properties
A topological group is a group together with a topology with respect to which the group composition and the inversion are continuous.
Closed subgroups of a compact group are compact again.

Let  be a compact group and let  be a finite-dimensional –vector space.

Since  we can do without the last requirement. In the following, we will consider in particular representations of compact groups in Hilbert spaces.

Just as with finite groups, we can define the group algebra and the convolution algebra. However, the group algebra provides no helpful information in the case of infinite groups, because the continuity condition gets lost during the construction. Instead the convolution algebra  takes its place.

Most properties of representations of finite groups can be transferred with appropriate changes to compact groups. For this we need a counterpart to the summation over a finite group:

Existence and uniqueness of the Haar measure 
On a compact group  there exists exactly one measure  such that:
 It is a left-translation-invariant measure

 The whole group has unit measure:

Such a left-translation-invariant, normed measure is called Haar measure of the group 

Since  is compact, it is possible to show that this measure is also right-translation-invariant, i.e. it also applies

All the definitions to representations of finite groups that are mentioned in the section ”Properties”, also apply to representations of compact groups. But there are some modifications needed:

To define a subrepresentation we now need a closed subspace. This was not necessary for finite-dimensional representation spaces, because in this case every subspace is already closed. Furthermore, two representations  of a compact group  are called equivalent, if there exists a bijective, continuous, linear operator  between the representation spaces whose inverse is also continuous and which satisfies  for all 

If  is unitary, the two representations are called unitary equivalent.

To obtain a –invariant inner product from a not –invariant, we now have to use the integral over  instead of the sum. If  is an inner product on a Hilbert space  which is not invariant with respect to the representation  of  then

is a –invariant inner product on  due to the properties of the Haar measure  Thus, we can assume every representation on a Hilbert space to be unitary.

Let  be a compact group and let  Let  be the Hilbert space of the square integrable functions on  We define the operator  on this space by  where 

The map  is a unitary representation of  It is called left-regular representation. The right-regular representation is defined similarly.

If  is infinite, these representations have no finite degree. The left- and right-regular representation as defined at the beginning are isomorphic to the left- and right-regular representation as defined above, if the group  is finite. This is due to the fact that in this case

Constructions and decompositions
The different ways of constructing new representations from given ones can be used for compact groups as well, except for the dual representation with which we will deal later. The direct sum and the tensor product with a finite number of summands/factors are defined in exactly the same way as for finite groups. This is also the case for the symmetric and alternating square. However, we need a Haar measure on the direct product of compact groups in order to extend the theorem saying that the irreducible representations of the product of two groups are (up to isomorphism) exactly the tensor product of the irreducible representations of the factor groups. First, we note that the direct product   of two compact groups is again a compact group when provided with the product topology. The Haar measure on the direct product is then given by the product of the Haar measures on the factor groups.

For the dual representation on compact groups we require the topological dual  of the vector space  This is the vector space of all continuous linear functionals from the vector space  into the base field. Let  be a representation of a compact group  in 

The dual representation  is defined by the property

On Hilbert spaces:  is irreducible if and only if  is irreducible.

By transferring the results of the section decompositions to compact groups, we obtain the following theorems:

Theorem. Every irreducible representation  of a compact group into a Hilbert space is finite-dimensional and there exists an inner product on  such that  is unitary. Since the Haar measure is normalized, this inner product is unique.

Every representation of a compact group is isomorphic to a direct Hilbert sum of irreducible representations.

This is the sum of all invariant closed subspaces  which are –isomorphic to 

Note that the isotypes of not equivalent irreducible representations are pairwise orthogonal.

Theorem.
(i)  is a closed invariant subspace of 
(ii)  is –isomorphic to the direct sum of copies of 
(iii) Canonical decomposition:  is the direct Hilbert sum of the isotypes  in which  passes through all the isomorphism classes of the irreducible representations.

Projection formula 
For every representation  of a compact group  we define

In general  is not –linear. Let

 

which is valid for the inner product of the Hilbert space 

Then  is –linear, because of

where we used the invariance of the Haar measure.

Proposition.

If the representation is finite-dimensional, it is possible to determine the direct sum of the trivial subrepresentation just as in the case of finite groups.

Characters, Schur's lemma and the inner product
Generally, representations of compact groups are investigated on Hilbert- and Banach spaces. In most cases they are not finite-dimensional. Therefore, it is not useful to refer to characters when speaking about representations of compact groups. Nevertheless, in most cases it is possible to restrict the study to the case of finite dimensions:

Since irreducible representations of compact groups are finite-dimensional and unitary (see results from the first subsection), we can define irreducible characters in the same way as it was done for finite groups.

As long as the constructed representations stay finite-dimensional, the characters of the newly constructed representations may be obtained in the same way as for finite groups.

Schur's lemma is also valid for compact groups:

Let  be an irreducible unitary representation of a compact group  Then every bounded operator  satisfying the property  for all  is a scalar multiple of the identity, i.e. there exists  such that 

Definition. The formula

defines an inner product on the set of all square integrable functions  of a compact group  Likewise 

The bilinear form on the representation spaces is defined exactly as it was for finite groups and analogous to finite groups the following results are therefore valid:

Theorem. Let  and  be the characters of two non-isomorphic irreducible representations  and  respectively. Then the following is valid 

 i.e.  has "norm" 

Theorem.

Irreducibility Criterion. Let  be the character of the representation  then  is a positive integer. Moreover  if and only if  is irreducible.

Corollary.

Lemma. Let  be a compact group. Then the following statements are equivalent:
  is abelian.
 All the irreducible representations of  have degree 

Orthonormal Property. Let  be a group.

As we already know that the non-isomorphic irreducible representations are orthonormal, we only need to verify that they generate  This may be done, by proving that there exists no non-zero square integrable function on  orthogonal to all the irreducible characters.

Just as in the case of finite groups, the number of the irreducible representations up to isomorphism of a group  equals the number of conjugacy classes of  However, because a compact group has in general infinitely many conjugacy classes, this does not provide any useful information.

The induced representation
If  is a closed subgroup of finite index in a compact group  the definition of the induced representation for finite groups may be adopted.

However, the induced representation can be defined more generally, so that the definition is valid independent of the index of the subgroup 

For this purpose let  be a unitary representation of the closed subgroup  The continuous induced representation  is defined as follows:

Let  denote the Hilbert space of all measurable, square integrable functions  with the property  for all  The norm is given by

and the representation  is given as the right-translation: 

The induced representation is then again a unitary representation.

Since  is compact, the induced representation can be decomposed into the direct sum of irreducible representations of  Note that all irreducible representations belonging to the same isotype appear with a multiplicity equal to 

Let  be a representation of  then there exists a canonical isomorphism

The Frobenius reciprocity transfers, together with the modified definitions of the inner product and of the bilinear form, to compact groups. The theorem now holds for square integrable functions on  instead of class functions, but the subgroup  must be closed.

The Peter-Weyl Theorem

Another important result in the representation theory of compact groups is the Peter-Weyl Theorem. It is usually presented and proven in harmonic analysis, as it represents one of its central and fundamental statements.

The Peter-Weyl Theorem. Let  be a compact group. For every irreducible representation  of  let  be an orthonormal basis of  We define the matrix coefficients  for  Then we have the following orthonormal basis of :

We can reformulate this theorem to obtain a generalization of the Fourier series for functions on compact groups:

The Peter-Weyl Theorem (Second version). There exists a natural –isomorphism 

History
The general features of the representation theory of a finite group G, over the complex numbers, were discovered by Ferdinand Georg Frobenius in the years before 1900. Later the modular representation theory of Richard Brauer was developed.

See also
Character theory
Real representation
Schur orthogonality relations
McKay conjecture
Burnside ring

Literature

[1]   
[2]   Fulton, William; Harris, Joe: Representation Theory A First Course. Springer-Verlag, New York 1991, .
[3]   Alperin, J.L.; Bell, Rowen B.: Groups and Representations Springer-Verlag, New York 1995, .
[4]   Deitmar, Anton: Automorphe Formen Springer-Verlag 2010, p. 89-93,185-189
[5]   Echterhoff, Siegfried; Deitmar, Anton: Principles of harmonic analysis Springer-Verlag 2009, p. 127-150
[6]   Lang, Serge:  Algebra Springer-Verlag, New York 2002, p. 663-729
[7]

References